Holy Weapon is a 1993 Hong Kong wuxia film directed by Wong Jing. The film's Chinese title means Seven Princesses of Wuxia.

Plot 
Holy Weapon presents the story of Seven Maidens who are recruited to challenge the threat posed by a Japanese swordsman of supernatural power and ability. Sword fighting, sorcery, mistaken identities and gender bending abound in this 1993 wire fu film.

The film is notable for a sequence in which six of the princesses "combine" into one giant warrior by standing on top of each other, invoking Super Robot tropes such as the "firing fist". this movie based from mixing gu long novels and ATV Hong Kong TV series: PARAGON OF SWORD AND KNIFE

Cast
Michelle Yeoh as Mon Ching-sze: Mo Kake's wife, who becomes stoic and jaded after his corruption and abandonment. She disguises herself as a man and becomes a ruthless vigilante and defender of women. She holds the key to unlocking the Yuen Tin Swords Technique, the only thing capable of destroying the Super Sword.
Damian Lau as Mo Kake: Ching-sze's husband and a great swordsman, who originally defeated the Super Sword. He was able to do this by artificially increasing his power, though this corrupts him and he goes into hiding. Eventually he becomes cleansed and trains the Seven Maidens.
Dicky Cheung as Ng Tung: The childish and goofy husband of Doll, he dreads losing his virginity to her. He is revealed to be able to turn into a woman by getting wet, and replaces the Princess as a member of the Seven Maidens. His wife in the end chooses to leave him.
Simon Yam as Super Sword: From Japan, he is the greatest swordsman in the world with a variety of supernatural powers. He is obsessed with getting revenge on Mo Kake, returning after 3 years to fight him again.
Ng Man-tat as Ghost Doctor: A wise but friendly sage, he is an old friend of Mo Kake who helps him recover from his corruption, and reunites him with his wife. He is the one who gathers the Seven Maidens, but is killed by the Super Sword.
Carol Cheng as Doll: Ng Tung's domineering and aggressive wife, who is desperate to consummate their marriage. She is put off by Yam Kin-fai's affections, but after his transformation into a woman, they become friends and fellow eligible bachelorettes.
Sandra Ng as Yam Kin-fai: The bumbling and incompetent bodyguard to the Princess, who falls in love with Doll. Born a man inside a woman's body, Yam is transformed into a (virgin) woman to complete the Seven Maidens by bringing out her lost feminine nature.
Maggie Cheung as Princess Tin Heung: Spoiled and selfish, she runs away from home to escape an arranged marriage to a Korean prince.  She falls in love Ng Tung, who she saves by allowing the Super Sword to hold her hostage.
Sharla Cheung as Spider: A man-killing Spider Ninja who is part of a group ordered to take the Princess back home. She defects after witnessing the master of her group raping her teammate. She was initially in love with Mon Ching-sze, before realizing she was a woman.
Charine Chan as Butterfly: Spider's tomboyish subordinate in their group, she looks up to Spider as an older sister.
Esther Kwan as Blonde: The gentle and kindhearted daughter of Ghost Doctor, who she serves as an assistant and apprentice to.

External links

Holy Weapon on lovehkfilm.com

1993 films
Hong Kong martial arts films
Wuxia films
Films directed by Wong Jing
1990s Hong Kong films